"This Probably Won't End Well" is the first official single song by American metal band All That Remains from their seventh album, The Order of Things. It was released January 13, 2015.

Song

Phil Labonte stated about the song: "The song's like, you know, it's kind of more of a rock song. That wasn't what we initially thought was gonna be the first single, you know, when we were writing. I mean, the song came together and we were like, 'You know, this one's really cool,' and then the label came in and were like, 'We want to put this one out first,' and we were like, 'Really?' And they were like, 'Yeah,' and we were like, 'Okay, it's cool with us, you know, it's not a… We're proud of the whole record."

Track listing

Personnel

All That Remains

Philip Labonte - lead vocals
 Oli Herbert - lead guitar
 Mike Martin - rhythm guitar
 Jeanne Sagan - bass guitar, backing vocals
 Jason Costa - drums

Additional

 Josh Wilbur - Production
 TBA - Mixing
 TBA - Mastering
 TBA - Artwork

Charts

References

2015 singles
All That Remains (band) songs
2015 songs
Razor & Tie singles
Songs written by Jason Costa
Songs written by Philip Labonte